Karnataka Brahmins or Carnatic Brahmins are Pancha Dravida Brahmin communities native to the Indian state of Karnataka.

Classification
Karnataka Brahmins fall under the Pancha Dravida Brahmin classification of the Brahmin community in India. Karnataka Brahmins are divided into three major sub-divisions, the Smarta, Madhva and Sri Vaishnava with several sub-divisions under each.

References

Kannada Brahmins

 
Tulu Nadu

Ethnic groups in India
Karnataka society
Mangalorean society

Dravidian peoples